Ruby's Torch is a 2006 Nanci Griffith album on Rounder Records. It is a collection of torch songs penned by  Griffith and various other artists, including Tom Waits, Jimmy Webb and Donal MacDonagh Long. All the songs are produced with lush backing arrangements from a string orchestra.

Track listing

"When I Dream" (Sandy Mason) 3:29
"If These Walls Could Speak" (Jimmy Webb) 3:40
"Ruby's Arms" (Tom Waits) 5:28
"Never Be The Sun" (Donal MacDonagh Long) 3:57
"Bluer Than Blue" (Charles Goodrum) 3:18
"Brave Companion of the Road" (Nanci Griffith) 3:29
"Grapefruit Moon" (Tom Waits) 4:20
"Please Call Me, Baby" (Tom Waits) 4:11
"Late Night Grand Hotel"  (Nanci Griffith) 2:53
"In the Wee Small Hours of the Morning" (David Mann, Bob Hilliard) 2:51
"Drops From The Faucet" (Frank Christian) 4:07

Personnel
 Larry Paxton - acoustic bass, electric guitar, acoustic guitar 
 Michael Johnson - acoustic guitar 
 Anthony La Marchina - cello
 John Catchings - cello
 Sari Reist - cello
 Kristin Wilkinson - conductor, violin
 Pat McInerney - drums, percussion 
 Roger Weismeyer - oboe
 James Hooker - piano, organ
 Neil Rosengarden - trumpet
 Larry Paxton - tuba [sousaphone]
 David Davidson - viola
 Gary Vanosdale - viola
 Jim Grosjean - viola
 Conni Ellisor - violin
 David Angell - violin
 Mary Kathryn Vanosdale - violin
 Monisa Angell - violin
 Pamela Sixfin - violin

References

External links 
 album at Rounder Records

Nanci Griffith albums
2006 albums
Albums produced by Peter Collins (record producer)
Rounder Records albums